The Miller College of Business is the business college of Ball State University in Muncie, Indiana. The college is named in honor of Wallace T. Miller, Jr. for his substantial donation to the university.

Research centers
The Miller College of Business has one stand-alone research center and four centers integrated into various academic departments.  The Center for Business and Economic Research, directed by Michael J. Hicks provides public policy and economic research in Indiana and the Midwest. The Entrepreneurship Center led by Matthew Marvel is a top ten entrepreneurship center nationally and offers a minor in entrepreneurship.  The Center for Professional Selling offers undergraduate and graduate degree programs in sales, the Center for Actuarial Science and  Risk Management directed by Steven Avila is a collaboration between the Department of Finance and Insurance and the Department of Mathematical Sciences.  The college also features the A. Umit Taftali Center for Capital Markets and Investing.

Notable alumni
Angela Ahrendts, former CEO, Burberry, current Senior Vice President of Retail and Online Stores, Apple Inc.
Kent C. Nelson, former chairman and CEO, UPS
John Schnatter, founder, spokesman, chairman and CEO of Papa John's International

References

Educational institutions established in 1979
Ball State University
Education in Delaware County, Indiana
1979 establishments in Indiana